Brigid Kelly is the state representative for the 31st District of the Ohio House of Representatives. She is a Democrat. The district consists of a portion of Cincinnati as well as Norwood, Amberley, Fairfax, Silverton, St. Bernard and a portion of Columbia Township in Hamilton County.

Life and career
Kelly was born and raised in Norwood, Ohio, and attended Saint Ursula Academy before graduating from Xavier University with a bachelors and the University of Cincinnati with her masters.  A member of a union household, Kelly for years has organized for the United Food and Commercial Workers Union.

Prior to state elected office, Kelly served on the Norwood City Council.

Ohio House of Representatives
In 2016, Representative Denise Driehaus was ineligible to run for a fifth term due to term-limits, and instead waged a successful bid for Hamilton County Commissioner.  Kelly had long been planning to succeed Driehaus, and indeed did announce her campaign for the Democratic nomination.  A safely Democratic seat, the primary was crowded, with six people running.  Kelly however easily won with a plurality of nearly 35%.

Kelly easily won the general election against Republican Mary E. Yeager	with 68% of the vote to take the seat.

References

External links
Ohio State Representative Brigid Kelly official site

Living people
Xavier University alumni
Democratic Party members of the Ohio House of Representatives
21st-century American politicians
Women state legislators in Ohio
21st-century American women politicians
Politicians from Cincinnati
Year of birth missing (living people)
People from Norwood, Ohio
University of Cincinnati alumni